Allah Bakhsh Mahalleh (also Romanized as Allāh Bakhsh Maḩalleh; also known as Allāh Bakhsh) is a village in Gil Dulab Rural District, in the Central District of Rezvanshahr County, Gilan Province, Iran. At the 2006 census, its population was 588, in 146 families.

References 

Populated places in Rezvanshahr County